Dope Don't Sell Itself is the seventh studio album by American rapper 2 Chainz. It was released through Def Jam Recordings on February 4, 2022. The album features guest appearances from Moneybagg Yo, BeatKing, Lil Baby, Roddy Ricch, 42 Dugg, YoungBoy Never Broke Again, Lil Durk, Sleepy Rose, Swae Lee, Stove God Cooks, Symba, Major Myjah, and Jacquees.

Background and promotion
On July 17, 2021, 2 Chainz took to social media to announce that his next project would serve as his last trap album. He revealed the release date on January 21, 2022. He then revealed the cover art through social media on January 25, 2022. The tracklist was revealed through the CD pre-order on his website two days later, on January 27, 2022. 2 Chainz explained that the cover art of the album refers to his "first bank account".

Singles
The album's lead single, "Million Dollars Worth of Game", which features American rapper 42 Dugg, was released on January 7, 2022. The second single, "Pop Music", which features American rappers Moneybagg Yo and BeatKing, was released on January 21, 2022.

Critical reception

Writing for Clash, Robin Murray felt that "seven albums deep, 2 Chainz has long perfected his brand" and "'Dope Don't Sell Itself' is, he says, his 'last trap album' and while it's a punchy farewell to that style, it's often slight, and occasionally shallow". Antoine-Samuel Mauffette Alavo of Exclaim! wrote that, with the album, "he proves that his relevance remains undeniable" and "his signature voice and raunchy style, matched with his expert-level beat selection, allow for his versatility to shine through, while his legend status nets him refreshing featured guests who never overshadow Chainz", adding, "loosely narrated with scripted hustler talk, the album's 12 tracks are held together by 2 Chainz's aura and voice more so than by melodic progression" and "while Dope Don't Sell Itself does not inspire immediate playback like Chainz's last outing, So Help Me God!, and doesn't contain the breakout hits of 2017's acclaimed Pretty Girls Like Trap Music, it is a testament to the rapper's longevity and his vital role in ATL's shifting scene as a gravitational figure for all to aspire to become."

HipHopDXs Armon Sandler wrote that the album "finds the Drenchgod at an identity-bound impasse" as "he mostly abandons his message-driven endeavor and tries desperately to revert back to why he's beloved: booming production, humorous bars galore and an affinity for connecting with younger stars no matter how much the sound of rap has changed", adding that "in attempting to recreate his peak, he offers some familiar flows but mostly unimpressive lyrics that lean more toward grown-up nursery rhymes than his catchy, skillful couplets of days past", "but this album probably won’t get a re-evaluation like his past work; his attempt to dial it back displays the colorful and zany bars that once captured ears are long gone". 

Writing for Pitchfork, Jackson Howard felt that Dope Don't Sell Itself is 2 Chainz's first album that "feels predictable" and as "a brisk 12 songs, it plays more like a mixtape of throwaways, a collection of forgettable, though occasionally great, bangers with of-the-moment features and total disregard for cohesion or risk", adding that "the songs here are serviceable, thanks to 2 Chainz's ear and charisma. But they're more like templates than novel creations, far from his days of sampling Hall & Oates or trading verses with Kendrick Lamar over a Pharrell beat seemingly constructed from cutlery and trash cans". Jayson Buford of Rolling Stone opined that the album is "actually an attempt at a return to form" rather than being declared as 2 Chainz's last trap album and "this record isn't the return to form that it aims to be, but Chainz is back in his element here".

Track listing

Charts

References

2022 albums
2 Chainz albums